Access Radio Chicago was the name used for four AM radio stations in the Chicago market, all owned by Newsweb Corporation offering brokered programming, ethnic programming, and occasional music:

 WAIT 850, Crystal Lake, Illinois
 WNDZ 750, Portage, Indiana
 WSBC 1240, Chicago, Illinois
 WCFJ 1470, Chicago Heights, Illinois